Mehltheuer is a village and a former municipality in the Vogtlandkreis district, in Saxony, Germany. Since 1 January 2011, it is part of the municipality Rosenbach.

During World War II, Germany operated a subcamp of the Flossenbürg concentration camp in the village, in which over 300 Jewish women from German-occupied Poland and Hungary were imprisoned as forced labour. The prisoners were liberated by American troops in 1945.

There is a train station in the village.

References 

Former municipalities in Saxony
Vogtlandkreis